Kilmuir (from the Scottish Gaelic Cille Mhoire, meaning Mary's Church) is a former fishing village, located on the north coast of the Moray Firth in the Black Isle and is in the Scottish council area of Highland.

References

External links

Populated places on the Black Isle